The Rivière aux Brochets is a tributary of the Ashuapmushuan River, flowing in the unorganized territory of Rivière-Mistassini, in the Maria-Chapdelaine Regional County Municipality, in the administrative region of Saguenay–Lac-Saint-Jean, in province of Quebec, in Canada.

The southern part of the Brochets river valley is mainly served by the forest road R0202.

Forestry is the main economic activity in this valley.

Geography 
The Rivière aux Brochets has its source at the mouth of Stackler Lake. Montagne Plate and Montagne des Bouleaux are located on the northwest side of Stackler Lake. This lake is fed by the discharge (coming from the west) of Lac Vidé and by the discharge (coming from the northwest) of a set of lakes including Chanceux, and Lac Denis.

The mouth of Stackler Lake is located in a forest zone in the unorganized territory of Rivière-Mistassini, at:
  northeast of a bend in the Ashuapmushuan River;
  north-west of Damville Lake;
  northwest of downtown Saint-Félicien.

  first towards the northeast, down the mountain and collecting the discharge (coming from the north) of lac au Huard, to the north shore of Lac du Lance-Pierres; then to the south-east, crossing the latter lake, to its mouth. Note: The northern part of this lake forms a Y; the central part receives from the west the discharge of Lake Judith; the southern part (triangular in shape) receives the discharge from the Twin Lakes on the northeast side, of which the northern lake in turn receives the discharge from Lac des Îles (from the northwest);
  towards the south-east, relatively in a straight line, crossing Lac au Sable and Lac des Ménés, and collecting a stream (coming from the north, i.e. the outlet of Lake Karina), to a bend in the river, corresponding to the discharge (coming from the east) of Damville Lake. Note: The last 1.7 km of this segment constitutes a widening of the river and is interconnected with Damville Lake;
  towards the south-west, passing under the forest road bridge R0202, then forming a hook towards the south to collect at the end of the segment a stream (coming from the north), until 'at its mouth.

The Brochets River flows into a bend in the river on the northeast bank of the Ashuapmushuan River. This confluence is located downstream of the Rapides du Fer à Cheval, and at:

  west of the center of the village of Girardville;
  north-west of downtown Saint-Félicien;
  northwest of the mouth of the Ashuapmushuan River.

Toponymy 
The toponym "rivière aux Brochets" was made official on September 29, 1975, at the Place Names Bank of the Commission de toponymie du Québec.

Notes and references

See also 
 List of rivers of Quebec

External links 
 

Rivers of Saguenay–Lac-Saint-Jean
Maria-Chapdelaine Regional County Municipality